Joseph Nguen Monytuil is the current Governor of Unity State - Bentiu, South Sudan, a post he has held since 2020. He is the first governor of Liech State, which was created by President Salva Kiir on 2 October 2015. Before his appointment as the governor of Northern Liech, he was the caretaker governor of the former Unity State deputized by Colonel Miabek Lang Miading Bil-Kuei from Panriang. Joseph's predecessor is the current vice president for infrastructure of the republic of South Sudan, Gen Taban Deng Gai.

References

Living people
South Sudanese politicians
Year of birth missing (living people)